Alison Hills is a British philosopher who specializes in moral philosophy and animal ethics.

Hills is Professor of Philosophy at St John's College, Oxford. She obtained her PhD in philosophy from Trinity College, Cambridge. She lectured in philosophy at Bristol University from 2003 to 2006 and joined St John's in 2006.

In September 2017 Hills was a member of the expert panel discussing Kant's Categorical Imperative on BBC Radio 4's In Our Time.

In 2005, Hills authored the book Do Animals Have Rights? The book was positively reviewed by Benjamin Hale as "carv[ing] a centre path between the so‐called ‘extreme’ animal rights view and the view which sees no merit in the claim that animals have rights".

Selected publications

Articles
Animal Responsibilities (The New Statesman, 2008)

Books

References 

Year of birth missing (living people)
Living people
Academics of the University of Oxford
Alumni of Trinity College, Cambridge
British animal rights scholars
British women philosophers
Fellows of St John's College, Oxford